Rodrigo Prats (February 7, 1909 – September 15, 1980) was a Cuban composer, arranger, violinist, pianist and orchestral director.

Biography 
The son of a musician, Jaime Prats, Rodrigo began to study music at the age of nine. He studied at first under his father, then under Emilio Reynosa, and finished later at the Conservatorio Orbón.

When only thirteen he played violin in the Cuban Jazz Band, the first band of its type in Cuba, which was directed by his father. At around the same time he joined the Orquesta Sinfónica de la Habana, founded by Gonzalo Roig. Prats' first work as a director of an orchestra was for the theatrical company of Arquímedes Pous; later he fronted many other groups. He was the founder of the radio band Orquesta Sinfónica del Aire, the Orquesta de Cámara del Círculo de Bellas Artes. He was deputy director of the Orquesta Filharmónica de la Habana, musical director of RHC-Cadena Azul, and of Canal 4 de TV. Prats was the founder and director at the Teatro Jorge Anckermann, and the musical director of the Teatro Lírico de La Habana. He joined the faculty of Havana's Studio Sylvia M. Goudie in 1956 after his stint at the Iranzo Conservatory.

His body of work includes popular music, sainetes (short comedies), and zarzuelas. Prats composed Una rosa de Francia, a famous criolla-bolero, at 15, and many other pieces, including Aquella noche, Espero de ti, Creo que te quiero and El tamalero. He wrote the music for sainetes such as El bravo and Soledad, and zarzuelas such as Amalia Batista, El pirata, Guamá, La perla del Caribe and María Belén Chacón. It is probably this work for the Cuban musical theatre for which he is best remembered.

Of these, the song associated with Amalia Batista is perhaps one of the best-known standards of Latin American music, having been recorded by multiple artists around the world.

Works or publications
Amalia Batista : zarzuela. 
Comparsa de la perla del Caribe. 
Corazón no llores. 
Dolor y amor : bolero. 
Los poemas musicales : composiciones liricas. 
María Belén Chacón : romanza cubana. 
Romanzas y canciones cubanas. 
Una rosa de Francia.

References

External links 
Rodrigo Prats Llorens, EcuRed.
Library and archival resources by or about Rodrigo Prats.
Magali O. Acosta Collection, 1956–1960 at the Cuban Heritage Collection, University of Miami Libraries. This archival collection contains parts and scores for arrangements written by Prats between 1956 and 1960.
A selection of Prats's original scores, including the zarzuela Amalia Batista, has been digitized by the Cuban Heritage Collection.

1909 births
1980 deaths
Cuban classical violinists
People from Sagua la Grande
Male classical violinists
Cuban classical pianists
Cuban classical composers
Cuban conductors (music)
Cuban opera composers
20th-century conductors (music)
20th-century classical violinists
20th-century classical composers
20th-century classical pianists
Male classical composers
Male opera composers
Male classical pianists
20th-century male musicians